Formally Haplochromis latifasciatus, Now Astatotilapia Latifasciata is a species of cichlid that is endemic to Uganda where restricted to the Lake Kyoga system, including Lake Bisina (a medium-sized lake to the east of Lake Kyoga itself) and Lake Nawampasa (a small lake southeast of Lake Kyoga itself and only separated by a thin swamp). It is also seen in the aquarium trade and it is easily bred in captivity. In the aquarium trade it is frequently labelled as Haplochromis "zebra obliquidens", which sometimes cause confusion with Haplochromis obliquidens, a separate species from Lake Victoria that is not known from the aquarium trade.

See also
List of freshwater aquarium fish species

References

latifasciatus
Endemic freshwater fish of Uganda
Fish described in 1929
Lake fish of Africa
Taxonomy articles created by Polbot